Twiddle or twiddling may refer to:
Twiddle (band), an American rock band
Twiddle factor, used in fast Fourier transforms in mathematics
Thumb twiddling, action of the hands
Twiddly bits, English idiom
Tilde character ( ~ ), sometimes referred to as "twiddle" or "squiggle"
Mr Twiddle, zookeeper character in Wally Gator animated TV series

See also
Bit twiddler (disambiguation), for various uses in computing
Twiddler, a one-handed input device